Waati is a 1995 Malian drama film directed by Souleymane Cissé. It was entered into the 1995 Cannes Film Festival.

Cast
 Sidi Yaya Cissé - Solofa
 Mariame Amerou Mohamed Dicko - Nandi at 6 years
 Balla Moussa Keita - Teacher
 Vusi Kunene
 Martin Le Maitre
 Eric Miyeni - The father
 Nakedi Ribane - The mother
 Adam Rose - Killer Policeman
 Niamanto Sanogo - Rastas' prophet
 Linèo Tsolo - Nandi
 Mary Twala - Grandmother

References

External links

1995 films
Malian drama films
Bambara-language films
1995 drama films
Films directed by Souleymane Cissé
Films scored by Bruno Coulais